Songs for Christmas was the first holiday studio album from contemporary worship musician Phil Wickham, and the album released on October 28, 2010 by INO Records. The album has seen commercial charting success, as well as, it has garnered critical acclamation from music critics.

Background and release
The album was released on October 28, 2010 by INO Records, and it was the first holiday studio album by Phil Wickham.

Music and lyrics
At Worship Leader, they compared his voice to the likes of Andrew Bird and Rufus Wainwright, but noted that they do not hold a candle to his voice, which was the best instrument used in the making of the album. Also, they wrote that all of the classic hallmarks of a Wickham album are present from the "guitars, keys, angelic-sounding choirs, even a banjo sprinkled in for good measure." Tyler Hess of Christian Music Zine wrote how the album was not "much of a rock album, more like slow tempo pop ballads".

Critical reception

Songs for Christmas garnered critical acclaim from music critics. Andrew Greer of Christianity Today rated the album four stars, and proclaimed the album to feature some "delightful artistry." At Worship Leader, they rated the album a perfect five stars, and noted how his original sounding voice comes "drip[ing] with passion". Brendan O'Regan of Cross Rhythms rated the album nine out of ten squares, which he felt that for his sake the album "comes close to being the perfect Christmas album", and highlighted that the cover art was esthetically pleasing. At Jesus Freak Hideout, Ryan Barbee rated the album four-and-a-half stars, and commented that the album was simply "incredible". Tyler Hess of Christian Music Zine rated the album four stars, which he said the album was just "nice", and the album should "[bring] a soft comfort for those looking forward to enjoying the Holiday." At The Christian Music Review Blog, Jonathan Kemp rated the album three-and-a-half stars, and wrote that the listener should just get the songs they liked rather than buying the whole project because it was not the "best" of Christmas albums.

Track listing

Charts

References

2010 albums
INO Records albums
Phil Wickham albums